Max Wheeler may refer to:
 Max Wheeler (footballer)
 Max Wheeler (linguist)